Dutch 10-cent coins may refer to:
Ten cent coin (Netherlands 1926–1941)
Ten cent coin (Netherlands 1941–1943)
Dubbeltje, all pre-Euro Dutch 10-cent coins